Stenopsocus immaculatus is a species of Psocoptera from Stenopsocidae family that can be found in Great Britain and Ireland. The species are yellowish-black coloured.

Habitat
The species feed on various trees including:
Alder
Ash
Beech
Birch
Blackthorn
 Broom
Elder
Field maple
Gorse
Hawthorn
Hazel
Honeysuckle
Hornbeam
Larch
Oak
Pine
Salix lapponum
Sallow
Spruce
Sycamore
Yew
They can also be found in leaf litter.

References

Stenopsocidae
Insects described in 1836
Psocoptera of Europe